Skylines is the first studio album by the American singer-songwriter Scott Liss, released under the moniker NightOnlyVisual in 2005. It was recorded from June through September 2004 at Retromedia Sound Studios in Red Bank, New Jersey with producer John Noll and engineer Paul Ritchie.

Track listing
All tracks written and arranged by Scott Liss.

 "We're Only Moments" – 3:01
 "Always" – 3:17 
 "a light in the hills" – 3:58
 "Side" – 3:51 
 "Already There" – 4:16 
 "In the Middle" – 3:56
 "Nothing In the World" – 2:48
 "Centuries" – 2:43
 "Skylines" – 3:18
 "Another Day" – 4:36

Release history
Skylines was released in the United States, Canada, and digitally online in 2005.

2005 albums